Oak Park Elementary School District 97 operates 10 schools, (eight elementary schools (K–5, unless otherwise noted) and two middle schools (6–8) in Oak Park, Illinois, USA.) The district has 376 teachers (FTEs) serving 4,923 students.

Note: Based on 2002–2003 school year data

External links

School districts in Cook County, Illinois
Oak Park, Illinois
Educational institutions in the United States with year of establishment missing